The Record Building is a historic U.S. site in St. Augustine, Florida. It is located at 154 Cordova Street. On April 26, 2006, it was added to the U.S. National Register of Historic Places.

References

External links
 Weekly List Of Actions Taken On Properties: 4/24/06 through 4/28/06 at National Register of Historic Places

Buildings and structures in St. Augustine, Florida
National Register of Historic Places in St. Johns County, Florida